Highways & Heartaches may refer to:

 Highways & Heartaches (Wade Hayes album), 2000
 Highways & Heartaches (Ricky Skaggs album), 1982